Robert Baldwin (1804–1858) was a Canadian statesman.

Robert Baldwin is also the name of:

Entertainment 
 Robert Baldwin (cartoonist) (1914–1977), American cartoonist
 Bob Baldwin (musician) (born 1960), American jazz musician and composer
 Robert Baldwin (actor) (born 1965), Canadian actor
 Robbie Baldwin, fictional superhero created in 1988

Politics 
 Robert C. Baldwin (1934–2016), American politician in Maryland
 Bob Baldwin (politician) (born 1955), Australian politician
 Robert-Baldwin, provincial electoral district in Quebec, Canada created in 1965

Others 
 Robert Baldwin, American pastor and distributor of Miracle Mineral Solution in Uganda
 Robert B. Baldwin (1923–2017), United States Navy vice admiral
 Robert P. Baldwin (1917–1994), United States Air Force flying ace in the Korean War
 Robert H. B. Baldwin (1920–2016), American businessman and Undersecretary of the U.S. Navy
 Bobby Baldwin (born 1950), American professional poker player
 Billy Baldwin (baseball) (Robert Harvey Baldwin, 1951–2011), American baseball player
 Tiny Baldwin (Robert West Baldwin, 1904–1959), American Negro league baseball player